German submarine U-1223 was a Type IXC/40 U-boat built for Nazi Germany's Kriegsmarine during World War II.

Design
German Type IXC/40 submarines were slightly larger than the original Type IXCs. U-1223 had a displacement of  when at the surface and  while submerged. She had two shafts and two  propellers.

U-1223 was fitted with six  torpedo tubes (four fitted at the bow and two at the stern), 22 torpedoes, one  SK C/32 naval gun, 180 rounds, and a  Flak M42 as well as two twin  C/30 anti-aircraft guns. The boat had a complement of forty-eight.

Service history
U-1223 was ordered on 25 August 1941 from Deutsche Werft in Hamburg-Finkenwerder under the yard number 386. Her keel was laid down on 25 November 1942 and was launched the following year on 23 June 1943. About three months later she was commissioned into service under the command of Kapitänleutnant Harald Bosüner (Crew 35) on 6 October 1943 in the 4th U-boat Flotilla.

While working up for deployment, U-1223 Bosüner was relieved and handed over command to Oberleutnant zur See Albert Kneip (Crew X/39) in March 1944. After completing training, the U-boat transferred to the 2nd U-boat Flotilla and left Kiel for the West Atlantic on 28 August 1944 for her first and only patrol. Stopping briefly in Bergen, Norway, for replenishment, she operated off the Canadian coast, damaging  on 14 October 1944 and the British steamer  on 2 November. Magog was towed back to port, but declared a constructive loss and decommissioned.

U-1223 arrived back in Kristiansand on Christmas Eve, 24 December 1944, and continued her journey to Flensburg, where she arrived three days later. Having been transferred to the 33rd U-boat Flotilla, she left Flensburg again for Königsberg on 5 January 1945, arriving there on the tenth. The U-boat experienced technical problems in the end of January 1945 and had to be towed into Stettin. Most of her crew was ordered to form a tank destroyer unit in Neustadt in Holstein under the command of the first watch officer.

When British forces closed in on the port, the U-boat was scuttled in position  on 5 May 1945. Her wreck was later broken up for scrap.

Summary of raiding history

References

Notes

Citations

Bibliography

World War II submarines of Germany
German Type IX submarines
1943 ships
U-boats commissioned in 1943
Ships built in Hamburg
Operation Regenbogen (U-boat)
Maritime incidents in May 1945